Hamamura (written: 浜村) is a Japanese surname. Notable people with the surname include:

, Japanese marathon runner
, Japanese businessman
, Japanese actor
, Japanese singer and actress
, Japanese tennis player
, Japanese politician

See also
Hamamura Station, a railway station in Tottori Prefecture, Japan.

Japanese-language surnames